Steve McCormick (born 14 August 1969) is a Scottish footballer, who played for Queen's Park, Stirling Albion, Dundee, Leyton Orient, Greenock Morton, Airdrieonians, East Fife, Clydebank and Dumbarton.

He was voted Scottish PFA Second Division Player of the Year and won the Daily Record Golden Shot award (first player to reach 30 goals in the SFL) in 1995–96. McCormick’s prolific goalscoring exploits in the 1995-96 season led to speculation about a sensational call up to the Scotland international squad for Euro 96.

References

External links

1969 births
Living people
Sportspeople from Dumbarton
Footballers from West Dunbartonshire
Scottish footballers
Association football forwards
Scottish Football League players
English Football League players
Queen's Park F.C. players
Stirling Albion F.C. players
Dundee F.C. players
Leyton Orient F.C. players
Greenock Morton F.C. players
Airdrieonians F.C. (1878) players
East Fife F.C. players
Clydebank F.C. (1965) players
Dumbarton F.C. players